The Glasgow Kelvingrove by-election of 13 March 1958 was held after the death of Conservative MP (MP) Walter Elliot.

The seat was marginal, having been won by the Conservatives at the 1955 United Kingdom general election by just short of 3,000 votes. Elliot's widow Katharine Elliot stood to replace her husband as a Unionist, but she was defeated by Labour's Mary McAlister.

Background
A former cabinet minister, Walter Elliot had first been elected for the seat in 1924, having previously been MP for Lanark. He had lost the seat in the Labour landslide of 1945, but after sitting as an MP for the Scottish Universities, had fought it again in 1950 and regained it.

David Murray, who stood as a 'Liberal Home-ruler' was not officially endorsed by the Liberal Party, but Scottish Liberal chairman J. M. Bannerman spoke in his favour "as an individual".

Result of the previous general election

Result of the by-election

References

1958 in Scotland
1950s elections in Scotland
1958 elections in the United Kingdom
By-elections to the Parliament of the United Kingdom in Glasgow constituencies
Kelvingrove by-election, 1958
November 1958 events in the United Kingdom